H. frontalis may refer to:
 Hemiargyropsis frontalis, a tachinid fly species
 Hemispingus frontalis, the oleaginous hemispingus, a bird species found in Colombia, Ecuador and Peru
 Hyperolius frontalis, a frog species found in Democratic Republic of the Congo and Uganda

See also
 Frontalis (disambiguation)